Dmytro Boyko (born 30 September 1981) is a Ukrainian professional footballer. He plays the position of midfielder and is 1.76 m tall and weighs 72 kg. His former clubs include FC Stal Alchevsk, FC Helios Kharkiv and JK Sillamäe Kalev.

External links

1981 births
Living people
Ukrainian footballers
JK Sillamäe Kalev players
Expatriate footballers in Estonia
Ukrainian expatriate footballers
Association football midfielders
Meistriliiga players
Ukrainian expatriate sportspeople in Estonia